Monochroa hornigi, the knotweed neb, is a moth of the family Gelechiidae. It was described by Otto Staudinger in 1883. It is found in most of Europe (except Ireland, Belgium, Luxembourg, Spain and most of the Balkan Peninsula), European Russia, western and south-eastern Siberia, Transbaikalia, Korea and Japan (Hokkaido).

The wingspan is about 9–12 mm. The forewings are dark fuscous, with two black stigmata on the plica and the disc and an ochreous, obliquely narrow, triangular blotch on the apical third of the costa and also on the tornus. There are three ochreous minute dots on the costa between the costal triangular blotch and the apex and three similar dots on the termen. The hindwings are fuscous. Adults are on wing from July to August in one generation per year.

The larvae feed on Polygonum species, including Polygonum lapathifolium and Polygonum aviculare. They mine the stems of their host plant and overwinter in a silken chamber.

References

Moths described in 1883
Monochroa